Laura Žemberyová (born 20 August 2001) is a Slovak footballer who plays as a midfielder for the University of Alabama at Birmingham and the Slovakia women's national team.

Club career
Žemberyová has played for Slavia Prague in the Czech Republic at the UEFA Women's Champions League.

College career
In January 2021, Žemberyová was added to the UAB Blazers roster.

International career
Žemberyová capped for Slovakia at senior level during the UEFA Women's Euro 2022 qualifying.

References

2001 births
Living people
Slovak women's footballers
Women's association football midfielders
SK Slavia Praha (women) players
Slovakia women's international footballers
Slovak expatriate footballers
Slovak expatriate sportspeople in the Czech Republic
Expatriate women's footballers in the Czech Republic
Slovak expatriate sportspeople in the United States
Expatriate women's soccer players in the United States
UAB Blazers women's soccer players
Czech Women's First League players
Sportspeople from Prešov